Raffi Farid Ahmad (born 17 February 1987) is an Indonesian media personality, presenter, actor, singer, entrepreneur and producer. As a Sundanese and Pakistani descent, He is the eldest son of Munawar Ahmad and Amy Qanita.

Early life
Raffi was born on 17 February 1987, in Bandung, West Java. He is the oldest child of three.

Career

2001–2011: Career beginnings 
Raffi began his career as a model. In 2001, he joined Cover Boy as a panelist. In addition to acting, he also appeared in TV advertisements, hosted, and performed as a singer. He began from supporting role in his first soap opera, Tunjuk Satu Bintang, and he became popular in Senandung Masa Puber at the time as lead role with Bunga Citra Lestari. After that, he continuously appeared in soap operas and film television and even one movie titled Love is Cinta. Raffi's acting in the movie got praise from film critics.

In 2006, the top musician, Melly Goeslaw, held a casting for vocal group Bukan Bintang Biasa, also known as BBB. This project devoted for Indonesian teen soap opera. From many artist starring the soap opera was auditioned, Raffi was selected with Laudya Cynthia Bella, Chelsea Olivia Wijaya, Dimas Beck, and Ayushita. Their first single, "Let's Dance Together", was well received. And then, BBB starred in a film directed by Lasja Fauzia called Bukan Bintang Biasa, the single from mentioned film, became most popular with the teenage demographic and the duet single with Ayushita, Jangan Bilang Tidak (translated "Don't Say No"), became the next single.

In 2008, Raffi's acting career more increasing when he appeared in a film produced by Rudy Soedjarwo, Liar and Asoy Geboy. And his name was more popular when he became a presenter in a music program, Dahsyat, who presented by two multi-talent artist, Luna Maya and Olga Syahputra. At the end of the year, BBB launched a new single, "Putus Nyambung", and the new single was received positive response. At the time, it dismissed that BBB only vocal group shortly.

In 2009, Raffi was touted as one of the best-selling artists of music program show, Dahsyat, more increasingly himself in presenter career. In addition to the music program show Dahsyat, he starred in two new programs, Rafi Wkwkwk and OMG, who pairing with Olga Syahputra. Yet, he also still exist in world of acting when starring in some film television, the opera soap Buku Harian Baim, and the sitcom OKB also starred by himself. In addition, he also released the new single, "Johan (Jodoh di Tangan Tuhan)", who duet with Laudya Chintya Bella.

On 26 February 2010, at the 2010 Dahsyatnya Awards, Raffi and Yuni Shara appeared together playing a medley of songs: "Johan (Jodoh di Tangan Tuhan") and "Kucari Jalan Terbaik". This was followed by various offers to pair the two in projects, including advertisements, the duets single "50 Tahun Lagi", and the movie Rumah Tanpa Jendela. He also directed a short film called Barbie, who starred by Yuni Shara. The 10-minute movie was awarded the "Best Movie" award at the 2011 LA Lights Indie Movie.

At the end of 2011, Raffi starred in a horror-comedy film titled Pocong Kesetanan. His existence and productivity get result the best work from program television, opera soap, film television, movie, commercials, and some business was managed by him, one of the Indonesian production house, Barometer Lite, which produces one of Indonesia's leading tabloids, put his name in the fourth position from 9 for Indonesian richest artists of 2011.

2012–present: Rising popularity 
On 28 August 2014, Raffi made a special appearance in the Indonesian movie Olga & Billy Lost in Singapore alongside Olga Syahputra, Billy Syahputra, Chand Kelvin, and Raffi's sister, Syahnaz Sadiqah.

Personal life
Raffi has dated several Indonesian actress such as Laudya Cynthia Bella, Bunga Zainal, Ratna Galih, Tyas Mirasih, and Velove Vexia. He became the subject of controversy in the media about his relationship with singer Krisdayanti's sister, Yuni Shara, who is 14 years his senior. Their relationship lasted for four years.

On October 17, 2014, he married his childhood sweetheart, actress Nagita Slavina, at the age of 27. Their marriage became a subject of great media attention and was broadcast live on television all around the country. Their wedding was held in three cities: Jakarta, Bandung, and Bali. The wedding consisted of a Javanese traditional procession followed by the marriage ceremony and reception in Jakarta, a private party in Bali, and a Ngunduh Mantu in Bandung.

On August 15, 2015, Nagita gave birth to a boy named Rafathar Malik Ahmad. Rafathar has since appeared in film, playing himself in Rafathar: The Movie, and also on the TV show Rumah Mama Amy (MNC TV).

Raffi is an active businessman. His line of businesses include a clothing line, also food, bodyspray, masks, and furniture brands.

Sports team ownership

Basketball clubs
  RANS PIK Basketball

Football clubs
  RANS Nusantara F.C.

Moto2 World Championship
 Pertamina Mandalika SAG Team

Discography

Studio album
 Kamulah Takdirku (2015)
 Rafathar (album) (2017)

Singles

Video clip

Filmography

Film

Soap Opera

Television series

Television shows
 Akademi Fantasi Indosiar 2006 (Indosiar)
 Pesta Air (RCTI)
 Hip Hip Hura (SCTV)
 Ekspresi (Indosiar)
 Musik By Request (SCTV)
 Musik Kolaborasi (SCTV)
 Dahsyat (RCTI)
 Kemilau Mandiri Fiesta (RCTI)
 Dahsyatnya Sahur (RCTI)
 Rafi Wkwkwk (Global TV – later in MNC Comedy)
 OMG (ANTV)
 3 Dekade (Trans TV)
 Boy & Girl Band Indonesia (SCTV)
 Cerita Cinta (MNC TV)
 Idolaku (RCTI)
 Sahur Semua Sahuuur (RCTI)
 BOOM!!! (Global TV)
 Yuni Raffi (Trans TV)
 Kata Hati (Indosiar)
 Idola Cilik 2013 (RCTI)
 Chit Chat Cuzz (Trans TV)
 Korslet (Trans TV)
 Slide Show (Trans TV)
Opera Van Java (Trans 7)
 Comedy Project (Trans TV)
 Saatnya Kita Sahur (Trans TV)
 Waktunya Kita Sahur (Trans TV)
 Raden Ayu (Global TV)
 Happy Happy (Trans TV)
 Late Night Show (Trans TV)
 Janji Suci Raffi & Gigi (Trans TV)
 BBB Story (Trans TV)
 Happy Show (Trans TV)
 Everybody Superstar (Trans TV)
 Sahur Itu Indah (Trans TV)
 Rumah Mama Amy (MNCTV)
 Primadona (MNCTV)
 Mari Kita Sahur (Trans TV)
 Super Deal (Season 5)  (ANTV)
 I Can See Your Voice Indonesia (MNCTV)
Sik Asix (MNCTV)
 Lucky Show (RCTI)
Raffi Billy and Friends (Trans TV)
 Take Me Out Indonesia (ANTV)
Kontes Dangdut Indonesia 2018 (MNCTV)
 Killer Karaoke Indonesia (ANTV)
It's Showtime Indonesia (MNCTV)
Rumah Seleb (MNCTV)
Okay Boss (Trans 7)
Ini Talkshow (NET.)
Dahsyatnya RaDen Ayu (RCTI)
Karnaval SCTV (SCTV)
Indonesia Pintar (SCTV - later in Mentari TV)
Siyap Bos (Trans 7)
Dahsyatnya Ramadan 2020 (RCTI)
Dahsyatnya 2020 (RCTI)
The Sultan (SCTV)
Rejeki Orang Sholeh (Trans TV)
Pop Academy (Indosiar)
The Next Influencer (ANTV)
Dahsyatnya 2021 (RCTI)
Raffi, Billy and Friends (Trans TV)
The Sultan Entertainment (SCTV)
Opera Van Java (Trans 7)
D'Cafe (Trans 7)
Ketawa Itu Berkah (Trans TV)
FYP (Trans 7)
Inbox (SCTV)
 (SCTV)

Commercials
 Ardilles
 Frozz
 Red A
 C59 T-shirt
 Kit Kat
 Iebe
 So Klin Smart
 Esco
 Suzuki Spin
 XL
 Kopi Ginseng Kukubima
 Suzuki New Swift Facelift
 Pixcom
 Oli Top 1 Action Matic
MS Glow
Tiket.com
Kratingdaeng
Tempra
Counterpain

Television shows producers 
 Cagur on the Street

Awards and nominations

References

External links 
 Profil di Indonesiaselebriti.com
  Profil dan berita di KapanLagi.com

1987 births
Living people
Indonesian television personalities
Indonesian television presenters
People from Bandung
Sundanese people
Indonesian people of Pakistani descent
Indonesian Muslims
Muslim male comedians
Indonesian actors

.
.